"In November, we closed our Aurora Sun facility and are now scaling back production at Aurora Sky to 25 per cent of its previous capacity," reads the statement.

Aurora Sky and  Aurora Sun are Canadian cannabis growing greenhouses and among the world's largest. Both were constructed by the firm Aurora Cannabis following the complete legalization of cannabis in Canada in 2018. The company calls them "Sky class" facilities.

Aurora Sky is a 100,000 kg per year,  cannabis growing greenhouse on Edmonton International Airport property in Leduc County, Alberta. Construction broke ground in June 2017, and it was completed in January 2019.

Construction on a 50% to 100% larger facility, Aurora Sun, at in Medicine Hat, was "paused" in late 2019. If construction were completed, Sun would become the largest cannabis greenhouse in the world.

References

External links

Buildings and structures in Alberta
Cannabis greenhouses
Cannabis in Alberta
Greenhouses in Canada